Falcatariella catalaiella is a moth in the family Cosmopterigidae. It is found in Madagascar.

This species has a wingspan of 36mm, winglength of 17mm and was named after Mr. Réné Catala.

References

Natural History Museum Lepidoptera generic names catalog

Cosmopterigidae
Moths described in 1949